Black Hill is a mountain situated in Morro Bay, California, part of Morro Bay State Park. It one of a series of volcanic plugs called the Nine Sisters.

Monterey Pine forest
There is a forest of Monterey Pine (Pinus radiata) trees on Black Hill, called Fleming's Forest, planted by John Fleming, a park superintendent. Fleming was working on another project and ordered twice as many trees as he needed, thinking that he would not get his entire order. Nevertheless, he received it in full and used the surplus on Black Hill.

Many of the trees have died or are dying from pine pitch canker, a fungal disease which also threatens the Monterey pine's remnant native groves in Cambria and on the Monterey Peninsula.

References

External links
 

Nine Sisters
Morro Bay
Landforms of San Luis Obispo County, California
Volcanic plugs of California
Hills of California